Yury Anatolyevich Logvinenko (born 22 July 1988) is a Kazakh football player who plays for Aktobe in the Kazakhstan Premier League, and the Kazakhstan national football team.

Career

Club career
Born in Aktyubinsk (now Aktobe), Logvinenko began his career with FC Aktobe and played for the club until 2016. The defender set the club record for most Premier League appearances, surpassing Samat Smakov, in August 2013.

On 31 January 2021, Logvinenko left Astana, to sign for Russian Premier League club Rotor Volgograd. On 22 March 2021, Rotor announced that Logvinenko had left the club by mutual consent due to injury.

On 5 May 2021, FC Aktobe announced the return of Logvinenko.

In January 2023, Logvinenko announced his retirement. Noting that he was glad to end his playing career in his native club "Aktobe".

International career
As of October 2013, Logvinenko has made twenty appearances for the Kazakhstan national football team.

During the Euro 2016 qualifying campaign, he scored two goals against Czech Republic in a 2–4 defeat at home.

Career statistics

Club

International

International goals 

Kazakhstan score listed first, score column indicates score after each Logvinenko goal.

Honours 
Aktobe
Kazakhstan Premier League (4): 2007, 2008, 2009, 2013
Kazakhstan Cup (1): 2008
Kazakhstan Super Cup (3): 2008, 2010, 2014

Astana
Kazakhstan Premier League (2): 2016, 2017
Kazakhstan Cup (1): 2016
Kazakhstan Super Cup (1): 2018

References 

1988 births
Living people
People from Aktobe
Kazakhstani people of Russian descent
Kazakhstani footballers
Kazakhstan international footballers
Kazakhstan Premier League players
FC Aktobe players
FC Astana players
FC Rotor Volgograd players
Association football defenders
Kazakhstani expatriate footballers
Expatriate footballers in Russia